Byzantine architecture is the architecture of the Byzantine Empire, or Eastern Roman Empire.

The Byzantine era is usually dated from 330 AD, when Constantine the Great moved the Roman capital to Byzantium, which became Constantinople, until the fall of the Byzantine Empire in 1453. However, there was initially no hard line between the Byzantine and Roman empires, and early Byzantine architecture is stylistically and structurally indistinguishable from earlier Roman architecture. This terminology was introduced by modern historians to designate the medieval Roman Empire as it evolved as a distinct artistic and cultural entity centered on the new capital of Constantinople (modern-day Istanbul) rather than the city of Rome and its environs.

Its architecture dramatically influenced the later medieval architecture throughout Europe and the Near East.

Characteristics

When the Roman Empire became Christian (after having extended eastwards) with its new capital at Constantinople, its architecture became more sensuous and ambitious. This new style with exotic domes and richer mosaics would come to be known as "Byzantine" before it traveled west to Ravenna and Venice and as far north as Moscow. Most of the churches and basilicas have high-riding domes, which  created vast open spaces at the centers of churches, thereby heightening the light. The round arch is a fundamental of Byzantine style. Magnificent golden mosaics with their graphic simplicity brought light and warmth into the heart of churches. Byzantine capitals break away from the Classical conventions of ancient Greece and Rome with sinuous lines and naturalistic forms, which are precursors to the Gothic style.

The richest interiors were finished with thin plates of marble or stone. Some of the columns were also made of marble. Other widely used materials were bricks and stone. Mosaics made of stone or glass tesserae were also elements of interior architecture. Precious wood furniture, like beds, chairs, stools, tables, bookshelves and silver or golden cups with beautiful reliefs, decorated Byzantine interiors.

In the same way the Parthenon is the most impressive monument for Classical religion, Hagia Sophia remained the iconic church for Christianity. The temples of these two religions differ substantially from the point of view of their interiors and exteriors. For Classical temples, only the exterior was important, because only the priests entered the interior, where the statue of the deity to whom the temple was dedicated was kept. The ceremonies were held outside, in front of the temple. Instead, Christian liturgies were held inside the churches.

Columns
Byzantine columns are quite varied, mostly developing from the classical Corinthian, but tending to have an even surface level, with the ornamentation undercut with drills.  The block of stone was left rough as it came from the quarry, and the sculptor evolved new designs to his own fancy, so that one rarely meets with many repetitions of the same design. One of the most remarkable designs features leaves carved as if blown by the wind; the finest example being at the 7th-century Hagia Sophia (Thessaloniki). Those in the Cathedral of Saint Mark, Venice (1071) specially attracted John Ruskin's fancy. Others appear in Sant'Apollinare in Classe, Ravenna (549).

The column in San Vitale, Ravenna (547) shows above it the dosseret required to carry the arch, the springing of which was much wider than the abacus of the column. On eastern columns the eagle, the lion and the lamb are occasionally carved, but treated conventionally.

There are two types of columns used at Hagia Sophia: Composite and Ionic. The Composite column that emerged during the Late Byzantine Empire, mainly in Rome, combines the Corinthian with the Ionic. Composite columns line the principal space of the nave. Ionic columns are used behind them in the side spaces, in a mirror position relative to the Corinthian or Composite orders (as was their fate well into the 19th century, when buildings were designed for the first time with a monumental Ionic order). At Hagia Sophia, though, these are not the standard imperial statements. The columns are filled with foliage in all sorts of variations. In some, the small, lush leaves appear to be caught up in the spinning of the scrolls – clearly, a different, nonclassical sensibility has taken over the design.

The columns at Basilica of San Vitale show wavy and delicate floral patterns similar to decorations found on belt buckles and dagger blades. Their inverted pyramidal form has the look of a basket.

Overview of extant monuments

Early Byzantine architecture drew upon earlier elements of Greco-Roman architecture. Stylistic drift, technological advancement, and political and territorial changes meant that a distinct style gradually resulted in the Greek cross plan in church architecture.

Buildings increased in geometric complexity, brick and plaster were used in addition to stone in the decoration of important public structures, classical orders were used more freely, mosaics replaced carved decoration, complex domes rested upon massive piers, and windows filtered light through thin sheets of alabaster to softly illuminate interiors.  Most of the surviving structures are sacred, with secular buildings having been destroyed.

Early architecture

Prime examples of early Byzantine architecture date from the Emperor Justinian I's reign and survive in Ravenna and Istanbul, as well as in Sofia (the Church of St Sophia).  One of the great breakthroughs in the history of Western architecture occurred when Justinian's architects invented a complex system providing for a smooth transition from a square plan of the church to a circular dome (or domes) by means of pendentives.

In Ravenna, the longitudinal basilica of Sant'Apollinare Nuovo, and the octagonal, centralized structure of the church of San Vitale, commissioned by Emperor Justinian but never seen by him, was built. Justinian's monuments in Istanbul include the domed churches of Hagia Sophia and Hagia Irene, but there is also an earlier, smaller church of Saints Sergius and Bacchus (locally referred to as "Little Hagia Sophia"), which might have served as a model for both in that it combined the elements of a longitudinal basilica with those of a centralized building.

Other structures include the ruins of the Great Palace of Constantinople, the innovative walls of Constantinople (with 192 towers) and Basilica Cistern (with hundreds of recycled classical columns). A frieze in the Ostrogothic palace in Ravenna depicts an early Byzantine palace.

Hagios Demetrios in Thessaloniki, Saint Catherine's Monastery on Mount Sinai, Jvari Monastery in present-day Georgia, and three Armenian churches of Echmiadzin all date primarily from the 7th century and provide a glimpse on architectural developments in the Byzantine provinces following the age of Justinian.

Remarkable engineering feats include the 430 m long Sangarius Bridge and the pointed arch of Karamagara Bridge.

The period of the Macedonian dynasty, traditionally considered the epitome of Byzantine art, has not left a lasting legacy in architecture. It is presumed that Basil I's votive church of the Theotokos of the Pharos and the Nea Ekklesia (both no longer existent) served as a model for most cross-in-square sanctuaries of the period, including the Cattolica di Stilo in southern Italy (9th century), the monastery church of Hosios Lukas in Greece (c. 1000), Nea Moni of Chios (a pet project of Constantine IX), and the Daphni Monastery near Athens (c. 1050).

The Hagia Sophia church in Ochrid (present-day North Macedonia), built in the First Bulgarian Empire in the time of Boris I of Bulgaria, and eponymous cathedral in Kiev (present-day Ukraine) testify to a vogue for multiple subsidiary domes set on drums, which would gain in height and narrowness with the progress of time.

Comnenian and Paleologan periods
In Istanbul and Asia Minor the architecture of the Komnenian period is almost non-existent, with the notable exceptions of the Elmali Kilise and other rock sanctuaries of Cappadocia, and of the Churches of the Pantokrator and of the Theotokos Kyriotissa in Istanbul. Most examples of this architectural style and many of the other older Byzantine styles only survive on the outskirts of the Byzantine world, as most significant and ancient churches and buildings were in Asia Minor. During World War I, almost all churches that ended up within the Turkish borders were destroyed or converted into mosques. Some were abandoned as a result of the Greek and Christian genocides from 1915 to 1923. Similar styles can be found in countries such as Bulgaria, Croatia, North Macedonia, Russia, Serbia and other Slavic lands, as well as in Sicily (Cappella Palatina) and Veneto (St Mark's Basilica, Torcello Cathedral).

The Paleologan period is well represented in a dozen former churches in Istanbul, notably St Saviour at Chora and St Mary Pammakaristos. Unlike their Slavic counterparts, the Paleologan architects never accented the vertical thrust of structures. As a result, the late medieval architecture of Byzantium (barring the Hagia Sophia of Trebizond) is less prominent in height.

The Church of the Holy Apostles (Thessaloniki) is cited as an archetypal structure of the late period with its exterior walls intricately decorated with complex brickwork patterns or with glazed ceramics. Other churches from the years immediately predating the fall of Constantinople survive on Mount Athos and in Mistra (e.g. Brontochion Monastery).  In Middle Byzantine architecture "cloisonné masonry" refers to walls built with a regular mix of stone and brick, often with more of the latter. The 11th or 12th-century Pammakaristos Church in Istanbul is an example.

Structural evolution

As early as the building of Constantine's churches in Palestine there were two chief types of plan in use: the basilican, or axial, type, represented by the basilica at the Holy Sepulchre, and the circular, or central, type, represented by the great octagonal church once at Antioch. 

Those of the latter type we must suppose were nearly always vaulted, for a central dome would seem to furnish their very purpose. The central space was sometimes surrounded by a very thick wall, in which deep recesses, to the interior, were formed, as at Church of St. George, Sofia, built by the Romans in the 4th century as a cylindrical domed structure built on a square base, and the noble Church of Saint George, Thessaloniki (5th century), or by a vaulted aisle, as at Santa Costanza, Rome (4th century); or annexes were thrown out from the central space in such a way as to form a cross, in which these additions helped to counterpoise the central vault, as at the Mausoleum of Galla Placidia, Ravenna (5th century). The most famous church of this type was that of the Holy Apostles, Constantinople. Vaults appear to have been early applied to the basilican type of plan; for instance, at Hagia Irene, Constantinople (6th century), the long body of the church is covered by two domes.

At Saint Sergius, Constantinople, and San Vitale, Ravenna, churches of the central type, the space under the dome was enlarged by having apsidal additions made to the octagon. Finally, at Hagia Sophia (6th century) a combination was made which is perhaps the most remarkable piece of planning ever contrived. A central space of 100 ft (30 m) square is increased to 200 ft (60 m) in length by adding two hemicycles to it to the east and the west; these are again extended by pushing out three minor apses eastward, and two others, one on either side of a straight extension, to the west. This unbroken area, about 260 ft (80 m) long, the larger part of which is over 100 ft (30 m) wide, is entirely covered by a system of domical surfaces. Above the conchs of the small apses rise the two great semi-domes which cover the hemicycles, and between these bursts out the vast dome over the central square. On the two sides, to the north and south of the dome, it is supported by vaulted aisles in two stories which bring the exterior form to a general square.

At the Holy Apostles (6th century) five domes were applied to a cruciform plan; the central dome was the highest. After the 6th century there were no churches built which in any way competed in scale with these great works of Justinian, and the plans more or less tended to approximate to one type. The central area covered by the dome was included in a considerably larger square, of which the four divisions, to the east, west, north and south, were carried up higher in the vaulting and roof system than the four corners, forming in this way a sort of nave and transepts. Sometimes the central space was square, sometimes octagonal, or at least there were eight piers supporting the dome instead of four, and the nave and transepts were narrower in proportion.

If we draw a square and divide each side into three so that the middle parts are greater than the others, and then divide the area into nine from these points, we approximate to the typical setting out of a plan of this time. Now add three apses on the east side opening from the three divisions, and opposite to the west put a narrow entrance porch running right across the front. Still in front put a square court. The court is the atrium and usually has a fountain in the middle under a canopy resting on pillars. The entrance porch is the narthex. Directly under the center of the dome is the ambo, from which the Scriptures were proclaimed, and beneath the ambo at floor level was the place for the choir of singers. Across the eastern side of the central square was a screen which divided off the bema, where the altar was situated, from the body of the church; this screen, bearing images, is the iconostasis. The altar was protected by a canopy or ciborium resting on pillars. Rows of rising seats around the curve of the apse with the patriarch's throne at the middle eastern point formed the synthronon. The two smaller compartments and apses at the sides of the bema were sacristies, the diaconicon and prothesis. The ambo and bema were connected by the solea, a raised walkway enclosed by a railing or low wall.

The continuous influence from the East is strangely shown in the fashion of decorating external brick walls of churches built about the 12th century, in which bricks roughly carved into form are set up so as to make bands of ornamentation which it is quite clear are imitated from Cufic writing. This fashion was associated with the disposition of the exterior brick and stone work generally into many varieties of pattern, zig-zags, key-patterns etc.; and, as similar decoration is found in many Persian buildings, it is probable that this custom also was derived from the East. The domes and vaults to the exterior were covered with lead or with tiling of the Roman variety. The window and door frames were of marble. The interior surfaces were adorned all over by mosaics or frescoes in the higher parts of the edifice, and below with incrustations of marble slabs, which were frequently of very beautiful varieties, and disposed so that, although in one surface, the coloring formed a series of large panels. The better marbles were opened out so that the two surfaces produced by the division formed a symmetrical pattern.

Legacy

In the West
Ultimately, Byzantine architecture in the West gave way to Carolingian, Romanesque, and Gothic architecture.  But a great part of current Italy used to belong to the Byzantine Empire before that. Great examples of Byzantine architecture are still visible in Ravenna (for example Basilica di San Vitale which architecture influenced the Palatine Chapel of Charlemagne).

In the East

As for the East, Byzantine architectural tradition exerted a profound influence on early Islamic architecture, particularly Umayyad architecture. During the Umayyad Caliphate era (661-750), as far as the Byzantine impact on early Islamic architecture is concerned, the Byzantine arts formed a fundamental source to the new Muslim artistic heritage, especially in Syria. There are considerable Byzantine influences which can be detected in the distinctive early Islamic monuments in Syria (709–715). While these give clear reference in plan - and somewhat in decoration - to Byzantine art, the plan of the Umayyad Mosque has also a remarkable similarity with 6th- and 7th-century Christian basilicas, but it has been modified and expanded on the transversal axis and not on the normal longitudinal axis as in the Christian basilicas. The tile work, geometric patterns, multiple arches, domes, and polychrome brick and stone work that characterize Muslim and Moorish architecture were influenced heavily by Byzantine architecture.

Post-Byzantine architecture in Eastern Orthodox countries
In Bulgaria, North Macedonia, Serbia, Romania, Belarus, Georgia, Armenia, Ukraine, Russia and other Orthodox countries the Byzantine architecture persisted even longer, from the 16th up to the 18th centuries, giving birth to local post-Byzantine schools of architecture.

 in Medieval Bulgaria: The Preslav and Tarnovo architectural schools.
 In Medieval Serbia: Raška architectural school, Vardar architectural school and Morava architectural school.

Neo-Byzantine architecture

Neo-Byzantine architecture was followed in the wake of the 19th-century Gothic revival, resulting in such jewels as Westminster Cathedral in London, and in Bristol from about 1850 to 1880 a related style known as Bristol Byzantine was popular for industrial buildings which combined elements of the Byzantine style with Moorish architecture. It was developed on a wide-scale basis in Russia during the reign of Alexander II by Grigory Gagarin and his followers who designed St Volodymyr's Cathedral in Kiev, St Nicholas Naval Cathedral in Kronstadt, Alexander Nevsky Cathedral in Sofia, Saint Mark's church in Belgrade and the New Athos Monastery in New Athos near Sukhumi. The largest Neo-Byzantine project of the 20th century was the Church of Saint Sava in Belgrade.

Important Byzantine monuments

Hagia Irene 

One of the less famous Byzantine churches is Hagia Irene. This church served as a model church for the more famous church, Hagia Sophia. Construction on the church began in the 4th century. This was the first church that was built in Constantinople, but due to its location, it was severely damaged by earthquakes and the Nika riots, and required repair several times. The Hagia Irene is defined by its large atrium, and is in fact the only surviving building of the Byzantine Empire to have such a feature.

Construction 
Hagia Irene is composed mainly of three materials: stone, brick, and mortar. Bricks 70 cm x 35 cm x 5 cm were used, and these bricks were glued together using mortar approximately 5 cm thick. The building materials chosen for the construction of the church had to be lightweight, durable, and strong. Volcanic materials were chosen for this purpose, as volcanic concrete is very light and durable. Perhaps the most definite feature of the Hagia Irene is the strict contrast between the interior and exterior design. While the plain outside composed of stone and brick favors functionality, the interior is decorated in elaborate mosaics, decorative marble, and, in some places, covered in plaster. Another important characteristic of the church include two domes that follow one behind another, the first being a lower oval, and the second being a higher semi-circle.

History of Hagia Irene 
Throughout history Hagia Irene has undergone several changes. There were multiple repairs due to the Nika riots and earthquakes. When the Ottomans took over Hagia Irene they repurposed it and made a few changes, but none as drastic as what was done to Hagia Sophia. Today, Hagia Irene is still standing and open to visitors as a museum. It is open everyday, except for Tuesdays.

Construction of Hagia Irene

Hagia Sophia 
The most famous example of Byzantine architecture is the Hagia Sophia, and it has been described as "holding a unique position in the Christian world", and as an architectural and cultural icon of Byzantine and Eastern Orthodox civilization. The Hagia Sophia held the title of largest church in the world until the Ottoman Empire sieged the Byzantine capital. After the fall of Constantinople, the church was used by the Muslims for their religious services until 1931, when it was reopened as a museum in 1935. Translated from Greek, the name Hagia Sophia means "Holy Wisdom".

Construction of Hagia Sophia 

The construction is a combination of longitudinal and central structures. This church was a part of a larger complex of buildings created by Emperor Justinian. This style influenced the construction of several other buildings, such as St. Peter's Basilica. Hagia Sophia should have been built to withstand earthquakes, but since the construction of Hagia Sophia was rushed this technology was not implemented in the design, which is why the building has had to be repaired so many times due to damages from the earthquakes. The dome is the key feature of Hagia Sophia as the domed basilica is representative of Byzantine architecture. Both of the domes collapsed at different times throughout history due to earthquakes and had to be rebuilt.

History of Hagia Sophia 
The original construction of Hagia Sophia was possibly ordered by Constantine, but ultimately carried out by his son Constantius II in 360. Constantine's building of churches, specifically the Hagia Sophia, was considered an incredibly significant component in his shift of the centralization of power from Rome in the west to Constantinople in the east, and was considered the high-point of religious and political celebration. The construction of the final version of the Hagia Sophia, which still stands today, was overseen by Emperor Justinian. Between the rule of these two Emperors, Hagia Sophia was destroyed and rebuilt twice. Following its reconstruction, Hagia Sophia was considered the center of Orthodox Christianity for 900 years, until the fall of Constantinople to the Ottomans.

Gallery

See also

 Architectural style
 Architecture of the Tarnovo Artistic School
 Architecture of Kievan Rus'
 Byzantine art
 Golden Age of medieval Bulgarian culture
 History of Roman and Byzantine domes
 Medieval architecture
 Neo-Byzantine architecture
 Ottoman architecture
 Russian-Byzantine architecture
 Sasanian architecture
 Armenian architecture

References

Works cited

Further reading
 Bogdanovic, Jelena. "The Framing of Sacred Space: The Canopy and the Byzantine Church", New York: Oxford University Press, 2017. .
 
 Fletcher, Banister; Cruickshank, Dan, Sir Banister Fletcher's a History of Architecture, Architectural Press, 20th edition, 1996 (first published 1896). . Cf. Part Two, Chapter 11.
 Mango, Cyril, Byzantine Architecture (London, 1985; Electa, Rizzoli).
 Ousterhout, Robert; Master Builders of Byzantium, Princeton University Press, 1999. .

External links

 Overview of Byzantine architecture in Constantinople (archived 28 November 2004)
 The temples of the new religion
 Christianization of the ancient temples
 Photographs and Plans of Byzantine Architecture in Turkey

 
4th-century architecture
5th-century architecture
6th-century architecture
7th-century architecture
8th-century architecture
9th-century architecture
10th-century architecture
11th-century architecture
12th-century architecture
13th-century architecture
14th-century architecture
15th-century architecture
Medieval architecture
Architectural styles
Architecture